Timmapur may refer to any of several villages in Karnataka, India:

 Timmapur, Belgaum district
 Timmapur, Gadag district
 Timmapur, Raichur district
 Timmapur (S.A.), Belgaum district
 M.Timmapur, Belgaum district

See also
 Thimmapur (disambiguation)